Local elections were held in Greece on 18 May 2014 (first round) and 25 May 2014 (second round). Voters elected representatives to the country's local authorities, comprising 13 regions and 325 municipalities.

Background
Traditionally, candidates at local elections do not run under the official name of any party as the constitution only foresees the participation of electoral lists (or "combinations") and not parties. Despite this theoretical independence and distinction, for all practical purposes most candidates run as local front organisations for political parties.

Issues
Greece is still facing a long-term government-debt crisis, which may affect the elections.

Election results

Source: Hellenic Ministry of the Interior

In the municipalities, as well as the regions, any candidate can participate in the first round. If the leading candidate does not have an absolute majority (50%+) of the votes, then a second round is held between the two leading candidates in the first round.

Regions

Attica
Contender Rena Dourou (SYRIZA) defeated incumbent Ioannis Sgouros (Society of Values) in the second round and succeeded him as Regional Governor of Attica.

Central Greece
Kostas Bakoyannis (ND) defeated Evangelos Apostolou (SYRIZA) in the second round and succeeded Klearchos Pergantas (PASOK) as Regional Governor of Central Greece.

Central Macedonia

Incumbent Apostolos Tzitzikostas (ANEL/EPAL/LAOS) defeated contender Giannis Ioannidis (ND) in the second round and remained Regional Governor of Central Macedonia.

Crete

Incumbent Stavros Arnaoutakis (Drasi) defeated contender Serafim Tsokas (ND) in the second round and remained Regional Governor of Crete.

Eastern Macedonia and Thrace

Giorgos Pavlidis (ND), the former prefect of Xanthi, defeated incumbent Aris Giannakidis (ind.) in the second round and succeeded him as Regional Governor of Eastern Macedonia and Thrace.

Epirus

Incumbent Alexandros Kachrimanis (ND) defeated contender Olga Gerovasili (SYRIZA) in the first round and remained Regional Governor of Epirus.

Ionian Islands

Contender Theodoros Galiatsatos (SYRIZA), defeated incumbent  (ND) in the second round and succeeded him as Regional Governor of the Ionian Islands.

North Aegean

Contender Christiana Kalogirou (ND) defeated incumbent  (ind.) in the second round and succeeded him as Regional Governor of the North Aegean.

Peloponnese

Incumbent Petros Tatoulis (ND) defeated contender Odysseas Voudouris (SYRIZA) in the second round and remained Regional Governor of Peloponnese.

South Aegean

Contender Giorgos Hatzimarkos (ND) defeated incumbent  (ind.) in the second round and succeeded him as Regional Governor of the South Aegean.

Thessaly

Incumbent  (ND) defeated contender Nikos Tsilimingas (DIMAR) in the second round and remained Regional Governor of Thessaly.

Western Greece 

Incumbent Apostolos Katsifaras (ind.) defeated contender Andreas Katsaniotis (Nea Dimokratia) in the second round and remained Regional Governor of Western Greece.

Western Macedonia

Contender Theodoros Karypidis (ind.), defeated incumbent  (ND) in the second round and succeeded him as Regional Governor of Western Macedonia.

Major municipalities

Athens

Thessaloniki

Nationwide percentage results

Reaction

The elections were regarded as a victory for SYRIZA, which was not expected to perform well due to its weak local organization. Candidates backed by the ruling New Democracy fared poorly, particularly Prime Minister Antonis Samaras' hand-picked candidates. In Athens, New Democracy failed to make the runoff for the first time since 1975.

In response the results, PM Samaras said "Greece must show it has the stability that it deserves" in the second round and European election scheduled to take place next week. Opposition leader Alexis Tsipras said it was a "historic day", and that next Sunday would be "the first day of a new era."

Notes

References

Local elections in Greece
2014 elections in Greece
2014 in Greek politics
May 2014 events in Europe